Annapurna I East is a subsidiary mountain of Annapurna I Main located in Nepal. It is 8,026 meters tall.

References

Eight-thousanders of the Himalayas
Mountains of the Gandaki Province